Max Trejo (born April 10, 2002) is a Mexican-American professional soccer player who plays for the Ohio State Buckeyes. Trejo is one of four Goalkeepers (abbreviated as  "keepers" or "GK") who are members of the university's men's soccer team for the 2022 season and is a redshirt freshman.

Career

Training and professional play 
Trejo was in his mid-teens when he began training at the Sporting Kansas City Academy and made his professional debut with Sporting Kansas City II. He continued his play joining Kaw Valley FC.

Ohio State 
In 2021, Trejo chose to accept an offer from Ohio State University to become a student-athlete, major in sport industry, and play for the Buckeyes men's soccer team. The team's head coach Brian Maisonneuve described Trejo as "an excellent goalkeeper," noting Trejo's "organizational skills are great and he gives confidence to his entire back line. He will have a great collegiate career and more."

Trejo did not appear in a match during the 2021 Ohio State Men's Soccer season as a freshman and was redshirted. Trejo became a redshirt freshman for the 2022 Buckeyes men's soccer season, and on September 13, 2022, Trejo served as starting Goalkeeper for the Buckeyes making his D-1 debut in a match at the University of Akron with the Buckeyes pulling out a 3-3 draw. In Trejo's second start as keeper against Indiana University on September 18, 2022, the Buckeyes won the home match 2-0. In Trejo's third starting appearance, the match ended in a nil-nil draw at Cleveland State University on September 21, 2022. In Trejo's fourth consecutive start as keeper, the #13 Ohio State team played against the #9 men's soccer team, the University of Maryland in College Park, Maryland, falling 0-1 from a second half Maryland goal on September 25, 2022. Trejo's official D-1 keeping record has him at 3 saves in 4 appearances (all 3 saves against ranked opponents) and his official standing is at 1 win (which was a shutout), 2 draws (one of which was a shutout), and 1 loss (1-2-1).

Personal life and interests 
A native of Mexico City, Mexico, Trejo migrated from Mexico to Miami and ultimately landed in Lawrence, Kansas, where he grew up, applied, and was accepted at Sporting Kansas City Academy. This led Trejo to his first appearances as a professional soccer player with Sporting Kansas City II (a team once known as Swope Park Rangers that was a member of the Division II professional soccer league USL Championship (USLC) and is now a member team of Division III pro league MLS NEXT Pro). 

Trejo states, regarding his four appearances as starting keeper for the Buckeyes in 2022 during an injury to veteran starting GK, Keagan McLaughlin, "I had to step up for the guys." … "At the start of the season, we were really cruising along, and I knew I needed to fill a big role, especially with Keagan out, and I really just focused into the spot. I was working really hard over the summer, and I just took the opportunity with both hands, and I just kept it with me."

Buckeyes head men's soccer coach Maisonneuve, speaking of Trejo's skills and attitude, especially during his four starts as starting keeper for the Buckeyes during the 2022 season said, "We saw him at Kansas City, and we knew what he was all about." … "Great shot stopper and just has a really mature and professional manner about him. I mean, you saw how he stepped in and just filled in Keagan's shoes, and then you know, just the way he presents himself and he holds himself." 

Former University of Notre Dame men's soccer team GK and the 2022 season starting GK for the Ohio State men's soccer team, Keagan McLaughlin, says this of Trejo, his eventual successor as starting keeper, "He brings it everyday." … "He's got an edge, which, like I said, he brings it every day to training and it keeps me sharp. And all I'll say is the Ohio State goalkeeping unit is in good hands for the future."

Trejo states regarding his teammates, "They always want to push you, no matter what." … "You drop a ball and they tell you to keep going. They won't ever bring you down. We always just want the best for ourselves in our teammates, even though we are competing for just one spot. At the end of the day, whoever gets it deserves it, and all you can do is just praise them and tell them they're doing a good job."

Trejo is a world traveler, scholar-athlete, social media creator, and a male fashion model who has worked in New York City, Los Angeles, and Paris. Additionally, Trejo has stated that he enjoys playing Xbox with his friends, that his second favorite sport behind soccer is golf, and that his favorite professional football club is Manchester United.

Citations

External links 
 Sporting KC profile
 Article regarding Max Trejo's first professional game.
 Interview with Trejo (video)
 Pre-match introduction of Trejo #28 (0:42) before the September 18, 2022 home match against Indiana University

2002 births
Living people
American soccer players
Association football goalkeepers
Mexican footballers
Ohio State Buckeyes men's soccer players
Soccer players from Kansas
Sportspeople from Lawrence, Kansas
Sporting Kansas City II players
USL Championship players